Marquise is a settlement in Newfoundland and Labrador. It is part of the Town of Placentia.

Populated places in Newfoundland and Labrador